The Bulgarian Men's Volleyball League is a men's volleyball competition organized by the Bulgarian Volleyball Federation (БФВ), it was created in 1945.

History 
16 teams participated in the 2020/21 championship in the Super League: Hebar Pazardzhik ( Pazardzhik ), Levski ( Sofia ), Neftokhimik ( Burgas ), Marek-Union ( Dupnitsa ), Montana ( Montana ), Dobrudzha ( Dobrich ), CSKA ( Sofia ), Pirin ( Razlog ), Lokomotiv ( Plovdiv ), Dunav ( Ruse ), Botev ( Lukovit ), Beroe ( Stara Zagora ), Teteven "," Slavia "( Sofia )," Black Sea "( Varna )," Arda "( Kardzhali). The champion title was won by Kheb-Pazardzhik, who won the final against Neftokhimik 3-0 (3: 1, 3: 0, 3: 1). The third place was taken by Levski.

Winners list

See also
Bulgarian Women's Volleyball League

References

External links
 Болгарская федерация волейбола
 Болгарский волейбол
 sports123.com

Bulgaria
Sports leagues established in 1945
1945 establishments in Bulgaria
Volleyball in Bulgaria
Professional sports leagues in Bulgaria